Timeless is the sixth studio album by Scottish pop rock quartet Wet Wet Wet, and the last to feature Marti Pellow on lead vocals. Released on 12 November 2007, the album was the band's first studio release in ten years, having not release a full studio recording since 10 in 1997. The album spawned only two singles; "Too Many People", which was released a week before the album on 5 November, and "Weightless", which followed on 4 February 2008.

The album is the band's lowest charting release to date, only peaking at #42 on the UK Albums Chart. The album artwork was designed by Klaus Voormann, who also designed the artwork for The Beatles album Revolver. A total of sixteen new tracks were released as part of the album campaign; eleven on the album itself, and five additional new tracks as B-sides. An orchestral version of "Eyes Wide Open" appears as a hidden track on physical copies of the album.

Tracklisting

Charts

References

2007 albums
Wet Wet Wet albums
Albums with cover art by Klaus Voormann